Birkebeinerrittet (lit. The Birkebeiner cycling race) is a long-distance mountain bike cycling race held annually in Norway. It is the world's largest mountain bike race in number of contestants. In 2009, 17,164 riders signed up, and 15,140 cyclists completed the race.

The race
The race starts in Rena and ends at Håkons Hall in Lillehammer. Birkebeinerrittet is 92km long along fire roads, with some paved and some single/dual-track segments.

The race has been held since 1993 and commemorates a trip made by the Birkebeiner loyalists to save the heir to the Norwegian throne, Håkon Håkonsson, in 1206. All participants carry a backpack weighing at least 3.5 kg, symbolizing the weight of the then one-year-old heir.

Past winners

Men

Women

External links
Official homepage (in Norwegian)

References

Mountain biking events in Norway
Åmot
Sport in Hedmark
Sport in Lillehammer